A hole is a hollow place, an opening in/through a solid body, or an excavation in the ground.

Hole or holes may also refer to:

Science and healthcare 
 Black hole
 Electron hole, a concept in physics and chemistry
 K-hole, a psychological state associated with ketamine use
 Sinkhole, a hole in the ground due to natural subterranean subsidence
 White hole
 Wormhole
 Hole (topology) - in a topological space, a hole is a sphere that cannot be continuously extended to a ball.

Technology 
 Blind hole, a hole, usually drilled, which does not emerge on the other side of the substrate
 Buttonhole, a hole in fabric as part of a fastener
 Punchhole, a hole punched in paper, including punched cards and punched tape
 Sound hole, on a musical instrument
 Through hole, a hole, usually drilled, which emerges on the other side of the substrate
 Tone hole, an opening in a wind instrument which, when closed changes the pitch
 Touch hole, part of a gun or cannon where the powder is ignited
 Whitewater hole, a feature found in some white-water rapids

Construction
 Fox hole, a defensive fighting position
 Lightening hole a hole made in a structural member, usually  of a vehicle, to lighten it
 Manhole, an opening in the ground to access the sewers or other underground services
 Murder-hole, or meurtrière, a hole in the ceiling of a gateway or passageway in a fortification through which the defenders could fire, throw, or pour harmful substances or objects down on attackers
 Porthole, a window on a ship's external hull
 Spider hole, a type of camouflaged one-man foxhole

People with the name 
 Hole (surname)
 Holes (surname)

Places
 Hôle, a municipality in Belgium also called Halen
 Høle, Norway, a borough and former municipality
 Hole, Norway, a municipality in Buskerud county, Norway

Prison 
Black Hole of Calcutta, small prison or dungeon in Fort William
Celle Hole (German: Celler Loch), a breach in the outer wall of the prison of Celle, Germany
 "In the hole", prison slang describing when an inmate is separated from the other inmates by the authorities in a separate, isolated unit
 "The hole", prison slang describing  the location for solitary confinement

Arts, entertainment, and media

Films
 Hole (film), 2014 Canadian short drama film directed by Martin Edralin
 Holes (film),  2003 theatrical adaptation of Louis Sachar's novel

Games
 Hole (chess), a chess term
 Hole, a poker term

Literature
 Holes (novel), 1998 young adult mystery by Louis Sachar
 Holes (play),  1998 stage adaptation of Louis Sachar's novel
 Plot hole, in writing

Music

Groups
 Hole (band), an alternative rock band formed by Courtney Love and Eric Erlandson in 1989

Albums and EPs
 Hole (EP), 2005 EP by 65daysofstatic
 Hole (Foetus album), 1984 album by Foetus
 Hole (Merzbow album), 1994 album by Merzbow
 Hole (One-Eyed Doll album), 2007 album by American band One-Eyed Doll
 Holes (album), 2004 album by melpo mene

Songs
 "Hole" (song), by Kelly Clarkson on the 2007 album My December
 "Holes" (Mercury Rev song), from the 1999 album Deserter's Songs
 "Holes" (Passenger song), a 2013 single from the 2012 album All the Little Lights
 "Holes", by Pint Shot Riot from the 2008 EP Round One
 "Holes", by Electric Guest from the 2012 album Mondo
 "Holes", by Scratch Acid from the 1986 album Just Keep Eating
 "Holes", by Rascal Flatts from the 2004 album Feels Like Today
 "Holes", by Jon Oliva's Pain from the 2006 album Maniacal Renderings
 "Holes", a 1985 single by Specimen
 "Holes", by Mateo Messina from the soundtrack to the 2015 film Barely Lethal
 "Holes" (born 1987), by Jetty Rae from the 2008 album Blackberries (2008)|Blackberries
 "Holes", by Smile Empty Soul from the 2005 album Anxiety
 "Holes", by Red Plastic Bag

Television
 "Hole" (Bottom), an episode of the British television sitcom Bottom
 "Holes" (American Horror Story), a 2017 episode of the anthology television series American Horror Story

Sports
 Hole (American football), a space between the defensive linemen
 Hole (golf), a segment of a golf course
 Hole in one (also known as a hole-in-one or an ace, mostly in American English), occurs when a ball hit from a tee to start a hole finishes in the cup
Hole-in-one Register (or United States Golf Register), the United States' official historical registry of holes-in-one
 Hole set, a position in water polo

Other uses
 Law of holes, an adage which states that "if you find yourself in a hole, stop digging"

See also
 
 
 Amsterdam Airport Schiphol
 Gap (disambiguation)
 Hol (disambiguation)
 Orifice (disambiguation)
 The Hole (disambiguation)
 Void (disambiguation)
 Whole (disambiguation)